Tevita Daugunu (born 12 November 1992) is a Fijian rugby sevens player. He was part of the Fiji sevens team that won a silver medal at the 2022 Commonwealth Games.

References 

1992 births
Living people
Male rugby sevens players
Fiji international rugby sevens players
Commonwealth Games medallists in rugby sevens
Commonwealth Games silver medallists for Fiji
Rugby sevens players at the 2022 Commonwealth Games
Medallists at the 2022 Commonwealth Games